The Crooked House of Windsor (also known as the Market Cross House) in Windsor, England, is a commercial building dating from 1687. It is the oldest teahouse in all of England. It is Grade II listed. The building was reconstructed in the eighteenth century and now stands on "an outrageous slant." It has three storeys and bay windows to the front and rear.

Notes

References
 

Buildings and structures in Windsor, Berkshire
Market houses
Grade II listed buildings in Berkshire
Grade II listed commercial buildings